The Sillies were a Detroit punk rock band formed early 1977 by auto assembly line worker Ben Waugh. The Sillies played their first show second-billed to The MC5. Later, they played with bands such as The Dead Boys, The Damned, The Cramps, and toured the United States and Canada. The band regrouped and toured the West Coast of North America in 2002 to support the release of their "debut" CD America's Most Wanton (Nebula/Scooch Pooch).

External links
 www.thesillies.com

Indie rock musical groups from Michigan
Musical groups from Detroit